Sgarbossa's criteria are a set of electrocardiographic findings generally used to identify myocardial infarction (also called acute myocardial infarction or a "heart attack") in the presence of a left bundle branch block (LBBB) or a ventricular paced rhythm.

Myocardial infarction (MI) is often difficult to detect when LBBB is present on ECG. A large clinical trial of thrombolytic therapy for MI (GUSTO-1) evaluated the electrocardiographic diagnosis of evolving  MI in the presence of LBBB.  The rule was defined by Dr. Elena Sgarbossa, Argentine- born American cardiologist. Among 26,003 North American patients who had a myocardial infarction confirmed by enzyme studies, 131 (0.5%) had LBBB. A scoring system, now commonly called Sgarbossa criteria, was developed from the coefficients assigned by a logistic model for each independent criterion, on a scale of 0 to 5. A minimal score of 3 was required for a specificity of 90%.

Sgarbossa's criteria 

Three criteria are included in Sgarbossa's criteria:
 ST elevation ≥1 mm in a lead with a positive QRS complex (i.e.: concordance) - 5 points
 concordant ST depression ≥1 mm in lead V1, V2, or V3 - 3 points
 ST elevation ≥5 mm in a lead with a negative (discordant) QRS complex - 2 points

≥3 points = 90% specificity of STEMI (sensitivity of 36%)

Usefulness 
A high take-off of the ST segment in leads V1 to V3 is well-described with uncomplicated LBBB, such as in the setting of left ventricular hypertrophy. In a substudy from the ASSENT 2 and 3 trials, the third criteria added little diagnostic or prognostic value.

A Sgarbossa score of ≥3 was specific but not sensitive (36%) in the validation sample in the original report. A subsequent meta-analysis of 10 studies consisting of 1614 patients showed that a Sgarbossa score of ≥3 had a specificity of 98% and sensitivity of 20%. The sensitivity may increase if serial or previous ECGs are available.

Other methods for detecting AMI in patients with LBBB 
Several other studies have evaluated the usefulness of different ECG findings in diagnosing MI when LBBB is present. Smith et al. modified Sgarbossa's original criteria.

Smith modified Sgarbossa rule:
 at least one lead with concordant STE (Sgarbossa criterion 1) or
 at least one lead of V1-V3 with concordant ST depression (Sgarbossa criterion 2) or
 proportionally excessively discordant ST elevation in V1-V4, as defined by an ST/S ratio of equal to or more than 0.20 and at least 2 mm of STE. (this replaces Sgarbossa criterion 3 which uses an absolute of 5mm)

Wackers et al. correlated ECG changes in LBBB with localization of the infarct by thallium scintigraphy. The most useful ECG criteria were:
 Serial ECG changes — 67 percent sensitivity
 ST segment elevation — 54 percent sensitivity
 Abnormal Q waves  — 31 percent sensitivity
 Cabrera's sign — 27 percent sensitivity, 47 percent for anteroseptal MI
 Initial positivity in V1 with a Q wave in V6 — 20 percent sensitivity but 100 percent specificity for anteroseptal MI

See also
 Electrocardiography in myocardial infarction

References 

Medical signs
Ischemic heart diseases
Electrodiagnosis